Helios is a three-metre high bronze, gilded sculpture created by T. B. Huxley-Jones in 1960, located at Television Centre in London, part of the Helios Building, a listed Building in White City. The statue was restored and returned to the site in 2017.

History

1960s
Helios was designed and created by the sculptor T. B. Huxley-Jones; it stood atop the central column in the rotunda at Television Centre in White City since the BBC headquarters opened in 1960.  The sculpture is named after the Greek god Helios, personification of the sun, and was intended to represent the radiation of the light of television around the globe.

2000s
Helios was cleaned and restored in 2017 and was returned to the newly refurbished Television Centre.

References

External links
mylondonnews Retrieved 12 July 2022
News item at lbhf.gov Retrieved 12 July 2022

Outdoor sculptures in London
Statues in London